Seeing is Believing (SiB) is a global initiative to tackle avoidable blindness. SiB is a partnership between Standard Chartered Bank PLC and the International Agency for the Prevention of Blindness (IAPB) (registered charity, No. 110059).

The newest phase, Phase IV – “A New Vision” was launched on World Sight Day 2008.  A major international effort will be made to set in place structures for the treatment of avoidable blindness now and for the future.

The programme is one of the beneficiaries of the money raised by the Gaborone City Marathon in Gaborone, Botswana.

References

External links

Standard Chartered
Blindness organisations in the United Kingdom